X Factor was the Swedish version of The X Factor, with the only season of the series debuting on September 9, 2012 and ending on December 7, 2012. The winner of the series was Awa Santesson-Sey. TV4 announced in January 2013 that Idol, another singing talent show seeking to discover the best singer through nationwide auditions, would return in 2013 and that X Factor will not continue.

Series summary
 Contestant in "Boys" category
 Contestant in "Girls" category
 Contestant in "Over 25s" category
 Contestant in "Groups" category

Judges' categories and their contestants
In the show's only season, each judge was allocated a category to mentor and chose three acts to progress to the live shows. This table shows which category each judge was allocated and which acts he or she put through to the live shows.

Key:
 – Winning judge/category. Winners are in bold, eliminated contestants in small font.

The only season
The only season of X Factor premiered on September 9, 2012 and ended on December 7, 2012. Leona Lewis, Axwell and E.M.D. were guest judges of the series at one point. Also, Britney Spears appeared in a video message to the contestants in the Girls category. One Direction and Olly Murs also performed on the live results shows.

24 acts reached judge's houses. Orup was helped by Eric Gadd, Ison by Leona Lewis, Carlsson by Axwell and Marie by E.M.D.

The twelve eliminated acts were:
 Boys: Simon Issa, Adam Kanyama, Lukas Wallströmer
 Girls: Sabina Ddumba, Juliette Holmqvist, Sara Nutti
 Over 25s: Kristin Amparo, Sofia Emefors, Christine Zakrisson
 Groups: Fusion, Natural Blondes, Sentiment Falls

Contestants

Key:
 – Winner
 – Runner-up
 – Third place

Results summary

Live show details

Week 1 (5 October)

Judges votes to eliminate
 Orup: NJOY
 Serneholt: Freja Modin
 Carlsson: NJOY
 Ison: NJOY

Week 2 (12 October)
Musical guest: Loreen ("Crying Out Your Name")

Judges votes to eliminate
 Orup: Hey Mary
 Serneholt: Freja Modin
 Carlsson: Freja Modin
 Ison: Freja Modin

Week 3 (19 October)

Judges votes to eliminate
 Ison: Frida Sandén
 Carlsson: Frida Sandén
 Serneholt: Frida Sandén
 Orup: Frida Sandén

Week 4 (26 October)

Judges votes to eliminate
 Ison: Manda Nilsénius
 Carlsson: Hey Mary
 Serneholt: Manda Nilsénius
 Orup: Hey Mary

Although Manda Nilsénius was eliminated, after checking the votes, it was revealed that Hey Mary had received the fewest votes in that week. Therefore, it was decided that both acts would continue to Week 5; to make up for this, two acts would be eliminated in Week 5.

Week 5 (2 November)
Musical guest: One Direction ("Live While We're Young" & "What Makes You Beautiful")

Judges votes to eliminate
 Orup: Oscar Zia
 Serneholt: Alexander Holmgren
 Carlsson: Oscar Zia
 Ison: Alexander Holmgren

Week 6 (9 November)
Musical guest: Danny Saucedo ("Delirious")

Judges votes to eliminate
 Orup: J.E.M
 Serneholt: Manda Nilsénius
 Carlsson: J.E.M
 Ison: Manda Nilsénius

Week 7 (16 November)
Musical guest: Olly Murs ("Heart Skips a Beat" & "Troublemaker")

Judges votes to eliminate
 Ison: Alexander Holmgren
 Carlsson: Isak Danielson
 Serneholt: Alexander Holmgren
 Orup: Isak Danielson

Week 8 (23 November)

Judges' votes to eliminate
 Ison: J.E.M
 Carlsson: Malcolm Brandin
 Serneholt: Malcolm Brandin
 Orup: Malcolm Brandin

Week 9: Semi-Final (30 November)

Public votes alone decided who would advance to the final.

Week 10: Final (7 December)

Xtra Factor
Xtra Factor was an after show which was broadcast after every week's live show and results. It was hosted in season one by Sara Lumholdt and Martin Björk.

Errors
In Week 4, David Hellenius incorrectly announced that Manda Nilsénius had received fewer public votes than Hey Mary from deadlock and had to leave the competition. But after checking the votes, it was revealed that Hey Mary had received the fewest votes in that week. Therefore, it was decided that both acts would continue to Week 5; to make up for this, two acts would be eliminated in Week 5.

References

Sweden
Swedish reality television series
Television series by Fremantle (company)
2012 Swedish television series debuts
2012 Swedish television series endings
Swedish television series based on British television series